Elijah Christian Ong Alejo (born November 13, 2004) is a Filipino actress. She is known for her villain roles in Prima Donnas as Brianna and Underage as Chynna.

In April 2020, she wrote her first Wattpad novel titled "Unexpectedly In Love".

Filmography

Television

Film

Accolades

References

External links

Sparkle Profile

Living people
Filipino television actresses
Filipino child actresses
2004 births
GMA Network personalities
Tagalog people
Filipino film actresses
21st-century Filipino actresses